"Love Thing" is a song by American recording artist Tina Turner from her 1991 greatest hits album, Simply the Best. The single was written by Holly Knight and Albert Hammond. The record also includes the non-album track "I'm a Lady", written and produced by Terry Britten and Graham Lyle.

Critical reception
Larry Flick from Billboard commented, "New song featured on upcoming greatest-hits collection, Simply the Best, is a swaggering rocker, replete with crunchy guitars and a muscular rhythm section. Tune and arrangement are a perfect match for Turner's signature growl." A reviewer from Liverpool Echo wrote, "Tough stuff this time with heavy rock riffs matched with aggressive vocals. Not for the faint-hearted."

Music video
A music video was produced to promote the single, directed by American film director and producer Michael Bay and featuring American model Tyra Banks.

Charts

Release history

References

Tina Turner songs
1991 singles
1991 songs
Capitol Records singles
Music videos directed by Michael Bay
Songs written by Holly Knight
Songs written by Albert Hammond